The 2015 Unibet World Series of Darts Finals was the inaugural event of the World Series of Darts Finals. The tournament took place in the Braehead Arena, Glasgow, Scotland, between 21–22 November 2015. It featured a field of 24 players formed up of a mix of players who had competed in the 2015 World Series of Darts, along with some invited players.

Michael van Gerwen won the title by beating Peter Wright 11–10 in the final.

Prize money

Qualification and format
The top eight players from the five World Series events of 2015 were seeded for this tournament. They were:

2015 Dubai Duty Free Darts Masters
2015 Japan Darts Masters
2015 Perth Darts Masters
2015 Sydney Darts Masters
2015 Auckland Darts Masters

Eight players were invited (as "international prospects"), as were the next four highest ranked players from the PDC Order of Merit on 15 September 2015. Another four places were awarded in a qualifying event that took place in Coventry on October 23, 2015.

The following players qualified for the tournament:

Draw

References

World Series of Darts
World Series of Darts
+2015
World Series of Darts
International sports competitions in Glasgow